The Kenya Records in Swimming are the fastest times ever swum by an individual representing Kenya. These national records are maintained by the Kenya Swimming Federation (KSF).

KSF keeps records for both for men and women, for long course (50m) and short course (25m) events. Records are kept in the following events (by stroke):
freestyle: 50, 100, 200, 400, 800 and 1500;
backstroke: 50, 100 and 200;
breaststroke: 50, 100 and 200;
butterfly: 50, 100 and 200;
individual medley: 100 (25m only), 200 and 400;
relays: 4×50 free, 4×100 free, 4×200 free, 4×50 medley, and 4 × 100 medley.

Long course (50m)

Men

|-bgcolor=#DDDDDD
|colspan=9|
|-

|-bgcolor=#DDDDDD
|colspan=9|
|-

|-bgcolor=#DDDDDD
|colspan=9|
|-

|-bgcolor=#DDDDDD
|colspan=9|
|-

|-bgcolor=#DDDDDD
|colspan=9|
|-

Women

|-bgcolor=#DDDDDD
|colspan=9|
|-

|-bgcolor=#DDDDDD
|colspan=9|
|-

|-bgcolor=#DDDDDD
|colspan=9|
|-

|-bgcolor=#DDDDDD
|colspan=9|
|-

|-bgcolor=#DDDDDD
|colspan=9|
|-

Mixed relay

Short Course (25m)

Men

|-bgcolor=#DDDDDD
|colspan=9|
|-

|-bgcolor=#DDDDDD
|colspan=9|
|-

|-bgcolor=#DDDDDD
|colspan=9|
|-

|-bgcolor=#DDDDDD
|colspan=9|
|-

|-bgcolor=#DDDDDD
|colspan=9|
|-

Women

|-bgcolor=#DDDDDD
|colspan=9|
|-

|-bgcolor=#DDDDDD
|colspan=9|
|-

|-bgcolor=#DDDDDD
|colspan=9|
|-

|-bgcolor=#DDDDDD
|colspan=9|
|-

|-bgcolor=#DDDDDD
|colspan=9|
|-

Mixed relay

References

External links
KSF official website
All-time bests Kenya swimrankings.net 15 November 2022 updated

Kenya
Records
Swimming
Swimming